Sound power or acoustic power is the rate at which sound energy is emitted, reflected, transmitted or received, per unit time. It is defined as "through a surface, the product of the sound pressure, and the component of the particle velocity, at a point on the surface in the direction normal to the surface, integrated over that surface."  The SI unit of sound power is the watt (W). It relates to the power of the sound force on a surface enclosing a sound source, in air. For a sound source, unlike sound pressure, sound power is neither room-dependent nor distance-dependent. Sound pressure is a property of the field at a point in space, while sound power is a property of a sound source, equal to the total power emitted by that source in all directions. Sound power passing through an area is sometimes called sound flux or acoustic flux through that area.

Sound power level LWA

Regulations often specify a method for measurement that integrates sound pressure over a surface enclosing the source. LWA specifies the power delivered to that surface in decibels relative to one picowatt. Devices (e.g., a vacuum cleaner) often have labeling requirements and maximum amounts they are allowed to produce. The A-weighting scale is used in the calculation as the metric is concerned with the loudness as perceived by the human ear. Measurements in accordance with ISO 3744 are taken at 6 to 12 defined points around the device in a hemi-anechoic space. The test environment can be located indoors or outdoors. The required environment is on hard ground in a large open space or hemi-anechoic chamber (free-field over a reflecting plane.)

Table of selected sound sources
Here is a table of some examples, from an on-line source. For omnidirectional sources in free space, sound power in LwA is equal to sound pressure level in dB above 20 micropascals at a distance of 0.2821 m

Mathematical definition
Sound power, denoted P, is defined by

where
f is the sound force of unit vector u;
v is the particle velocity of projection v along u;
A is the area;
p is the sound pressure.

In a medium, the sound power is given by

where
A is the area of the surface;
ρ is the mass density;
c is the sound velocity;
θ is the angle between the direction of propagation of the sound and the normal to the surface.
p is the sound pressure.
For example, a sound at SPL = 85 dB or p = 0.356 Pa in air (ρ =  and c = ) through a surface of area A =  normal to the direction of propagation (θ = 0°) has a sound energy flux P = .

This is the parameter one would be interested in when converting noise back into usable energy, along with any losses in the capturing device.

Relationships with other quantities
Sound power is related to sound intensity:

where
A stands for the area;
I stands for the sound intensity.

Sound power is related sound energy density:

where
c stands for the speed of sound;
w stands for the sound energy density.

Sound power level

Sound power level (SWL) or acoustic power level is a logarithmic measure of the power of a sound relative to a reference value.
Sound power level, denoted LW and measured in dB, is defined by:

where
P is the sound power;
P0 is the reference sound power;
 is the neper;
 is the bel;
 is the decibel.

The commonly used reference sound power in air is

The reference sound power P0 is defined as the sound power with the reference sound intensity  passing through a surface of area :

hence the reference value .

Relationship with sound pressure level
The generic calculation of sound power from sound pressure is as follows:

where:
 defines the area of a surface that wholly encompasses the source.  This surface may be any shape, but it must fully enclose the source. 
 
In the case of a sound source located in free field positioned over a reflecting plane (i.e. the ground), in air at ambient temperature, the sound power level at distance r from the sound source is approximately related to sound pressure level (SPL)  by

where
Lp is the sound pressure level;
A0 = 1 m2;
 defines the surface area of a hemisphere; and 
r must be sufficient that the hemisphere fully encloses the source.

Derivation of this equation:

For a progressive spherical wave,

 (the surface area of sphere)
where z0 is the characteristic specific acoustic impedance.

Consequently,

and since by definition , where  is the reference sound pressure,

The sound power estimated practically does not depend on distance. The sound pressure used in the calculation may be affected by distance due to viscous effects in the propagation of sound unless this is accounted for.

References

External links
Sound power and Sound pressure. Cause and Effect
Ohm's Law as Acoustic Equivalent. Calculations
Relationships of Acoustic Quantities Associated with a Plane Progressive Acoustic Sound Wave
NIOSH Powertools Database 
Sound Power Testing

Acoustics
Sound
Sound measurements
Physical quantities
Power (physics)